Schwesnitz is a river of Bavaria, Germany. It is formed at the confluence of its source rivers Perlenbach and Höllbach in Rehau. It flows into the Saale in Oberkotzau.

See also
List of rivers of Bavaria

References

Rivers of Bavaria
Rivers of Germany
Hof (district)